is a 1991 Japanese comedy horror film directed by Shūsuke Kaneko. It stars Ken Ogata as a pharmaceutical company employee who finds himself in intensive care after a critical injury and during a transfusion is given the blood of Count Dracula.

Plot
After the complete destruction of Count Dracula, his vampiric blood arrives in Japan, where a young scientist who is researching vampires hides it in a hospital for later experiments.

At the same time, Shutaro Ishikawa, who works for a pharmaceutical company, discovers a scandal, but is killed before he can make it public. In the hospital, he accidentally receives some of Dracula's blood. The young scientist tells the daughter of Shutaro to drop blood on his ashes to allow him to revive.

One year later, Shutaro is reborn as a vampire. After some familiarization with his situation and help from his daughter and the scientist, his goal is to avenge his murder by feasting on the blood of the strong and virile.

Cast
 Ken Ogata as Shutaro Ishikawa
 Hideyo Amamoto as Servant
 Harumi Harada as Takeda
 Sumiyo Hasegawa as Enokida
 Hikari Ishida as Saeko
 Narumi Yasuda as Yuzuko

Reception
Hikari Ishida won seven awards for Best New Actress: Japan Academy Awards, Blue Ribbon Awards, Hochi Film Awards, Kinema Junpo Awards, Mainichi Film Concours, Nikkan Sports Film Award, Yokohama Film Festival.

Ken Ogata was nominated as Best Actor for the 1992 Japan Academy Awards, but did not win.

References

External links
 
 Varietyjapan.com 
 Cinemafareast.de 

1991 films
1990s Japanese-language films
Japanese comedy horror films
Vampire comedy films
Films directed by Shusuke Kaneko
1990s comedy horror films
1991 comedy films
Films scored by Kow Otani
1990s Japanese films